is a Japanese professional baseball player for the Tohoku Rakuten Golden Eagles of the Nippon Professional Baseball (NPB).

Career
Hokkaido Nippon-Ham Fighters selected Nishikawa with the second selection in the 2010 NPB draft.

On March 30, 2012, Nishikawa made his NPB debut.

Nishikawa hit a walk-off grand slam in the bottom of the ninth inning of Game 5 of the 2016 Japan Series, which Nishikawa would go on to win.

On February 27, 2019, he was selected first time for Japan national baseball team at the 2019 exhibition games against Mexico.

In 2020, Nishikawa hit .296/.419/.388 with 5 home runs, 15 doubles, and 3 triples to go along with 37 stolen bases. After the 2020 season, on December 3, 2020, the Fighters announced it was allowing Nishikawa to enter the posting system to play in Major League Baseball (MLB). On January 3, 2021, Nishikawa failed to secure a deal with any of the MLB teams. Nishikawa became a free agent following the 2021 season.

On December 22, 2021, Nishikawa signed with the Tohoku Rakuten Golden Eagles of Nippon Professional Baseball.

References

1992 births
Living people
Baseball people from Wakayama Prefecture
Hokkaido Nippon-Ham Fighters players
Japanese baseball players
Nippon Professional Baseball first basemen
Nippon Professional Baseball left fielders
Nippon Professional Baseball second basemen
Tohoku Rakuten Golden Eagles players